Sigrid Wille (born 2 November 1969 in Wangen im Allgäu, Baden-Württemberg) is a German cross-country skier who competed from 1991 to 1999. She has won a bronze medal in the 4 × 5 km relay at the 1999 FIS Nordic World Ski Championships in Ramsau, and had her best finish of 13th in the 30 km event at the 1995 FIS Nordic World Ski Championships.

Wille's best individual finish at the Winter Olympics was 28th in the 15 km event at Nagano in 1998. Her lone individual victory was in a 5 km event in Slovenia in 1993.

Cross-country skiing results
All results are sourced from the International Ski Federation (FIS).

Olympic Games

World Championships
 1 medal – (1 bronze)

World Cup

Season standings

Team podiums
 1 podium

a.  1999 World Championship races are included in the 1998–99 World Cup scoring system.

References

External links

1969 births
Living people
People from Wangen im Allgäu
Sportspeople from Tübingen (region)
German female cross-country skiers
Cross-country skiers at the 1998 Winter Olympics
FIS Nordic World Ski Championships medalists in cross-country skiing
Olympic cross-country skiers of Germany